The Paris Convention of 1919 (formally, the Convention Relating to the Regulation of Aerial Navigation) was the first international convention to address the political difficulties and intricacies involved in international aerial navigation.  The convention was concluded under the auspices of the International Commission for Air Navigation (forerunner to ICAO).  It attempted to reduce the confusing patchwork of ideologies and regulations which differed by country by defining certain guiding principles and provisions, and was signed in Paris on October 13, 1919.

History

The first passenger-carrying airline flight happened in 1913 with the St. Petersburg-Tampa Airboat Line.  Before that time, aircraft had been used to carry mail and other cargo.  With the start of World War I in 1914, aircraft were being operated internationally to carry not only cargo, but also as military assets.  The international use of aircraft brought up questions about air sovereignty.  The arguments over air sovereignty at the time factored into one of two main viewpoints: either no state had a right to claim sovereignty over the airspace overlying its territory, or every state had the right to do so.

The Paris Convention of 1919 sought to determine this question as part of the process of framing the convention's assumptions, and it was decided that each nation has absolute sovereignty over the airspace overlying its territories and waters.

The nations that signed the treaty were: Belgium, Bolivia, Brazil, the British Empire, China, Cuba, Ecuador, France, Greece, Guatemala, Haiti, the Hejaz, Honduras, Italy, Japan, Liberia, Nicaragua, Panama, Peru, Poland, Portugal, Roumania, the Kingdom of Yugoslavia, Siam, Czechoslovakia, and Uruguay.  Ultimately, the convention was ratified by 11 states, including Persia, which had not signed it. The United States never ratified it because of its linkage to the League of Nations. The treaty came into force in 1922.

The Paris Convention was superseded by the Convention on International Civil Aviation (also known as the Chicago Convention).

Principles

The following principles governed the drafting of the convention: 
 Each nation has absolute sovereignty over the airspace overlying its territories and waters.  A nation, therefore, has the right to deny entry and regulate flights (both foreign and domestic) into and through its airspace.
 Each nation should apply its airspace rules equally to its own and foreign aircraft operating within that airspace, and make rules such that its sovereignty and security are respected while affording as much freedom of passage as possible to its own and other signatories' aircraft.
 Aircraft of contracting states are to be treated equally in the eyes of each nation's law.
 Aircraft must be registered to a state, and they possess the nationality of the state in which they are registered.

Contents
It had 9 chapters, dealing with: 
 General Principles
 Nationality of aircraft
 Certificates of airworthiness and competency
 Admission to air navigation above foreign territory
 Rules to be observed on departure when under way and on landing
 Prohibited transport
 State aircraft
 International Commission for air navigation
 Final Provisions

Related
 Convention on International Civil Aviation
 Warsaw Convention

References

External links
Text, League of Nations Treaty Series
 The Postal History of ICAO: The 1919 Paris Convention

International Civil Aviation Organization treaties
Treaties concluded in 1919
1919 in aviation
1919 in France
League of Nations treaties
Treaties of Belgium
Treaties of Bolivia
Treaties of the United Kingdom (1801–1922)
Treaties of the French Third Republic
Treaties of the Kingdom of Greece
Treaties of the Empire of Japan
Treaties of the Portuguese First Republic
Treaties of the Kingdom of Yugoslavia
Treaties of Thailand
Treaties of Liberia
Treaties of the Qajar dynasty
Treaties of the United States
Treaties of the First Brazilian Republic
Treaties of the Republic of China (1912–1949)
Treaties of Cuba
Treaties of Ecuador
Treaties of Guatemala
Treaties of Haiti
Treaties of the Kingdom of Hejaz
Treaties of Honduras
Treaties of the Kingdom of Italy (1861–1946)
Treaties of Nicaragua
Treaties of Panama
Treaties of Peru
Treaties of the Second Polish Republic
Treaties of the Kingdom of Romania
Treaties of Czechoslovakia
Treaties of Uruguay
Treaties extended to Canada
Treaties extended to Australia
Treaties extended to New Zealand
Treaties extended to the Union of South Africa
Treaties extended to British India